Marquess Lie of Zhao (?-400 BCE) was a ruler of the State of Zhao during the Warring States period of Chinese history (475-220 BCE). Born Zhào Jí, his father was Marquess Xian of Zhao.

During his reign the Marquess employed righteous and humane government officials including Gōng Zhònglián, Niú Xù, Xún Xīn and Xú Yuè whilst himself following the virtuous “Way of the King”.

When fierce cavalry from the State of Zhōngshān attacked the State of Zhao, Marquess Lie allied with Marquess Wen of Wei of the State of Wei to attack Zhongshan and afterwards moved the Zhao capital to Hándān.

In the sixth year of Marquess Lie's reign (403 BCE), Zhao, along with Wei and Han, became vassal states of the Zhou Kingdom as a result of the Partition of Jin.

Marquess Lie died in 400 BCE in the second year of the reign of King An of Zhou. Since his son was underage, Marquess Lie's younger brother Zhào Wŭgōng succeeded him as ruler.

Monarchs of Zhao (state)
Zhou dynasty nobility
5th-century BC Chinese monarchs
Zhao (state)
Founding monarchs